Anthony McFadden (born 18 May 1957) is an English former footballer who scored 10 goals from 47 appearances in the Football League playing as a forward for Darlington in the early 1980s. He also played non-league football for clubs including Reyrolles and Blyth Spartans, for whom he scored 123 goals.

References

1957 births
Living people
Sportspeople from Hexham
Footballers from Northumberland
English footballers
Association football forwards
Hebburn Town F.C. players
Darlington F.C. players
Blyth Spartans A.F.C. players
English Football League players